Andreu Bosch (22 February 1931 – 17 December 2004) was a Spanish footballer. He played in six matches for the Spain national football team from 1953 to 1955. He was also named in Spain's squad for the Group 6 qualification tournament for the 1954 FIFA World Cup.

References

1931 births
2004 deaths
Spanish footballers
Spain international footballers
Footballers from Barcelona
Association football midfielders
FC Barcelona players
Real Betis players